Stromatolites or stromatoliths are layered sedimentary formations (microbialite) that are created mainly by photosynthetic microorganisms such as cyanobacteria, sulfate-reducing bacteria, and Pseudomonadota (formerly proteobacteria). These microorganisms produce adhesive compounds that cement sand and other rocky materials to form mineral "microbial mats". In turn, these mats build up layer by layer, growing gradually over time. A stromatolite may grow to a meter or more. Although they are rare today, fossilized stromatolites provide records of ancient life on Earth.

Morphology

Stromatolites are layered, biochemical, accretionary structures formed in shallow water by the trapping, binding and cementation of sedimentary grains in biofilms (specifically microbial mats), through the action of certain microbial lifeforms, especially cyanobacteria. They exhibit a variety of forms and structures, or morphologies, including conical, stratiform, domal, columnar, and branching types. Stromatolites occur widely in the fossil record of the Precambrian, but are rare today. Very few Archean stromatolites contain fossilized microbes, but fossilized microbes are sometimes abundant in Proterozoic stromatolites.

While features of some stromatolites are suggestive of biological activity, others possess features that are more consistent with abiotic (non-biological) precipitation. Finding reliable ways to distinguish between biologically formed and abiotic stromatolites is an active area of research in geology. Be it as it may, multiple morphologies of stromatolites may exist in a single local or geological strata, relating to the specific conditions occurring in different region and water depths.  

Most stromatolites are spongiostromate in texture, having no recognisable microstructure or cellular remains. A minority are porostromate, having recognisable microstructure; these are mostly unknown from the Precambrian but persist throughout the Palaeozoic and Mesozoic. Since the Eocene, porostromate stromatolites are known only from freshwater settings.

Formation
Time lapse photography of modern microbial mat formation in a laboratory setting gives some revealing clues to the behavior of cyanobacteria in stromatolites. Biddanda et al. (2015) found that cyanobacteria exposed to localized beams of light moved towards the light, or expressed phototaxis, and increased their photosynthetic yield, which is necessary for survival. In a novel experiment, the scientists projected a school logo onto a petri dish containing the organisms, which accreted beneath the lighted region, forming the logo in bacteria. The authors speculate that such motility allows the cyanobacteria to seek light sources to support the colony. In both light and dark conditions, the cyanobacteria form clumps that then expand outwards, with individual members remaining connected to the colony via long tendrils. This may be a protective mechanism that affords evolutionary benefit to the colony in harsh environments where mechanical forces act to tear apart the microbial mats. Thus these sometimes elaborate structures, constructed by microscopic organisms working somewhat in unison, are a means of providing shelter and protection from a harsh environment.

Lichen stromatolites are a proposed mechanism of formation of some kinds of layered rock structure that are formed above water, where rock meets air, by repeated colonization of the rock by endolithic lichens.

Fossil record 
Some Archean rock formations show macroscopic similarity to modern microbial structures, leading to the inference that these structures represent evidence of ancient life, namely stromatolites. However, others regard these patterns as being due to natural material deposition or some other abiogenic mechanism. Scientists have argued for a biological origin of stromatolites due to the presence of organic globule clusters within the thin layers of the stromatolites, of aragonite nanocrystals (both features of current stromatolites), and of other microstructures in older stromatolites that parallel those in younger stromatolites that show strong indications of biological origin.

Stromatolites are a major constituent of the fossil record of the first forms of life on earth. They peaked about 1.25 billion years ago and subsequently declined in abundance and diversity, so that by the start of the Cambrian they had fallen to 20% of their peak. The most widely supported explanation is that stromatolite builders fell victim to grazing creatures (the Cambrian substrate revolution); this theory implies that sufficiently complex organisms were common over 1 billion years ago. Another hypothesis is that protozoans such as foraminifera were responsible for the decline, favoring formation of thrombolites over stromatolites through microscopic bioturbation.

Proterozoic stromatolite microfossils (preserved by permineralization in silica) include cyanobacteria and possibly some forms of the eukaryote chlorophytes (that is, green algae). One genus of stromatolite very common in the geologic record is Collenia.

The connection between grazer and stromatolite abundance is well documented in the younger Ordovician evolutionary radiation; stromatolite abundance also increased after the end-Ordovician and end-Permian extinctions decimated marine animals, falling back to earlier levels as marine animals recovered. Fluctuations in metazoan population and diversity may not have been the only factor in the reduction in stromatolite abundance. Factors such as the chemistry of the environment may have been responsible for changes.

While prokaryotic cyanobacteria reproduce asexually through cell division, they were instrumental in priming the environment for the evolutionary development of more complex eukaryotic organisms. Cyanobacteria are thought to be largely responsible for increasing the amount of oxygen in the primeval earth's atmosphere through their continuing photosynthesis (see Great Oxygenation Event). Cyanobacteria use water, carbon dioxide, and sunlight to create their food. A layer of polysaccharides often forms over mats of cyanobacterial cells. In modern microbial mats, debris from the surrounding habitat can become trapped within the polysaccharide layer, which can be cemented together by the calcium carbonate to grow thin laminations of limestone. These laminations can accrete over time, resulting in the banded pattern common to stromatolites. The domal morphology of biological stromatolites is the result of the vertical growth necessary for the continued infiltration of sunlight to the organisms for photosynthesis. Layered spherical growth structures termed oncolites are similar to stromatolites and are also known from the fossil record. Thrombolites are poorly laminated or non-laminated clotted structures formed by cyanobacteria, common in the fossil record and in modern sediments. There is evidence that thrombolites form in preference to stromatolites when foraminifera are part of the biological community.

The Zebra River Canyon area of the Kubis platform in the deeply dissected Zaris Mountains of south western Namibia provides an extremely well exposed example of the thrombolite-stromatolite-metazoan reefs that developed during the Proterozoic period, the stromatolites here being better developed in updip locations under conditions of higher current velocities and greater sediment influx.

Modern occurrence

Saline locations
Modern stromatolites are mostly found in hypersaline lakes and marine lagoons where extreme conditions due to high saline levels prevent animal grazing. One such location where excellent modern specimens can be observed is Hamelin Pool Marine Nature Reserve, Shark Bay in Western Australia. Another location is Pampa del Tamarugal National Reserve in Chile. A third is Lagoa Salgada ("Salty Lake"), in the state of Rio Grande do Norte, Brazil, where modern stromatolites can be observed as both bioherms (domal type) and beds. Inland stromatolites can also be found in saline waters in Cuatro Ciénegas Basin, a unique ecosystem in the Mexican desert, and in Lake Alchichica, a maar lake in Mexico's Oriental Basin. The only open marine environment where modern stromatolites are known to prosper is the Exuma Cays in the Bahamas.

In 2010, a fifth type of chlorophyll, namely chlorophyll f, was discovered by Min Chen from stromatolites in Shark Bay.

Modern freshwater stromatolites

Laguna de Bacalar in Mexico's southern Yucatán Peninsula in the state of Quintana Roo, has an extensive formation of living giant microbialites (that is, stromatolites or thrombolites). These may be the largest sized living freshwater microbialites, or any organism, on Earth.

Alchichica Lake in Puebla, Mexico has two distinct morphologic generations of stromatolites: columnar-dome like structures, rich in aragonite, forming near the shore line, dated back to 1,100 years before present (ybp) and spongy-cauliflower like thrombolytic structures that dominate the lake from top to the bottom, mainly composed of hydromagnesite, huntite, calcite and dated back to 2,800 ybp.

A little farther to the south, a 1.5 km stretch of reef-forming stromatolites (primarily of the genus Scytonema) occurs in Chetumal Bay in Belize, just south of the mouth of the Rio Hondo and the Mexican border.

Large, up to 40 m high, microbialite towers were discovered in the largest soda lake on Earth: 460 m deep Lake Van in Eastern Turkey. They are composed of aragonite growing on presumably precipitating inorganically  calcite at sub-lacustrine karst-water sources.

Freshwater stromatolites are found in Lake Salda in southern Turkey. The waters are rich in magnesium and the stromatolite structures are made of hydromagnesite.

Two instances of freshwater stromatolites are also found in Canada, at Pavilion Lake and Kelly Lake in British Columbia. Pavilion Lake has the largest known freshwater stromatolites and NASA is currently conducting xenobiology research there. NASA, the Canadian Space Agency, and numerous universities from around the world are collaborating on a project to study the microbialite life in the lakes. Called the "Pavilion Lake Research Project" (PLRP), its aim is to study what conditions on the lakes' bottoms are most likely to harbor life and develop a better hypothesis on how environmental factors affect microbialite life. The end goal of the project is to better understand what conditions would likely harbor life on other planets.
Now concluded, there was a citizen science project conducted online called "MAPPER" where volunteers sorted through thousands of photos of the lake bottoms and tagged the presence of microbialites, algae and other lake bed features.

Microbialites have been discovered in an open pit pond at an abandoned asbestos mine near Clinton Creek, Yukon,
Canada. These microbialites are extremely young and presumably began forming soon after the mine closed in 1978. The combination of a low sedimentation rate, high calcification rate, and low microbial growth rate appears to result in the formation of these microbialites. Microbialites at an historic mine site demonstrates that an anthropogenically constructed environment can foster microbial carbonate formation. This has implications for creating artificial environments for building modern microbialites including stromatolites.

A very rare type of non-lake dwelling stromatolite lives in the Nettle Cave at Jenolan Caves, NSW, Australia. The cyanobacteria live on the surface of the limestone, and are sustained by the calcium rich dripping water, which allows them to grow toward the two open ends of the cave which provide light.

Stromatolites composed of calcite have been found in both the Blue Lake in the dormant volcano, Mount Gambier and at least eight cenote lakes including the Little Blue Lake in the Lower South-East of South Australia.

See also

 Banded iron formation
 Cotham Marble
 Gunflint Range
 Laguna Negra, Catamarca
 Microbially induced sedimentary structure
 Ojos de Mar

References

Further reading

External links

Stromatolite photo gallery, a teaching set from Ohio State University

 
Trace fossils
Cyanobacteria
Sedimentary rocks